Owain Llewelyn Williams (1964 – 12 September 2021) was a Welsh rugby union player who played as a back row forward for Glamorgan Wanderers, Bridgend, and Cardiff, and the national team. He was the brother of Gareth Williams. He played for Cardiff 221 times, and in the course of his career was in two Welsh Cup-winning sides and also appeared in the inaugural Heineken Cup. He had four children, two of whom, Teddy and Henri, are also rugby players.

After his career in rugby, Williams became a production designer for film and television, namely for the BBC medical drama Casualty.

In 2006 Williams received eye surgery as a result of suffering from cancer. He died at age 56 from cancer.

References

1960s births
1964 births
2021 deaths
Welsh rugby union players
Wales international rugby union players
Glamorgan Wanderers RFC players
Bridgend RFC players
Cardiff RFC players
British production designers